The Hexer or The Witcher (Polish: Wiedźmin) is a 2001 Polish fantasy film directed by Marek Brodzki and written by Michał Szczerbic. It stars Michał Żebrowski as Geralt of Rivia. The story is based on the books and stories of The Witcher written by Polish author Andrzej Sapkowski.

The 13-episode television series came out the following year. The film has been described as essentially the then-unreleased television series condensed into a two-hour film, and received very poor reviews from both fans and critics. The film was the first attempt to depict The Witcher universe in the cinema.

Premise
The television series and the film were loosely based on Andrzej Sapkowski's The Witcher (Wiedźmin) book series.

Cast
 Michał Żebrowski as Geralt of Rivia
 Zbigniew Zamachowski as Dandelion
 Maciej Kozłowski as Falwick
 Tomasz Sapryk as Dermot Marranga
 Kinga Ilgner as Renfri
 Grażyna Wolszczak as Yennefer
 Ewa Wiśniewska as Calanthe
 Andrzej Chyra as Borch Three Jackdaws
 Anna Dymna as Nenneke
 Agata Buzek as Pavetta
 Jarosław Boberek as Yarpen Zigrin
 Dorota Kamińska as Eithne
 Wojciech Duryasz as Old Witcher
 Józef Para as Druid of Kaer Morhen
 Daniel Olbrychski as Filavandrel

Production 
The film had a budget of 19 million Polish zlotys, which was very high for contemporary Polish movies. Similarly, the film's marketing campaign had several times the budget of other Polish films of that time, in an attempt to imitate Hollywood's super-production. The film was aimed not just at science fiction and fantasy fans, but also at a general audience. To that end, its cast included many stars of Polish cinema, the music was composed by a well-known Polish composer, and the film was tied to a number of other promotional campaigns and related products inspired by the Witcher universe, such as toys and games, as well as the first official English translation of The Witcher.

The Hexer was the first film directed by Marek Brodzki. The final release was described as the third version of the film, rearranged and shortened. Some fans initially objected to the casting of several major roles. Their protests, reported in the press, led to a meeting between the producers and the cast and fans, which eventually appeased most of the protesters. Citing two major departures from his original script, screenwriter  demanded that his name not appear in the closing credits.

Reception 
The film received generally negative reviews after its release and since, with reviewers being generally positive in regard to actors and music, but critical of the plot and special effects.

Marcin Kamiński of Filmweb concluded that "it is not a good movie", noting that the plot was chaotic, mixing various adventures and scenes from the book series in a mostly random manner. Kamiński speculated that the film was intended as a glorified trailer for the subsequent television series. The montage of the scenes was considered so bad that it was said to evoke laughter in the audience, and the special effects were described as low-quality and obsolete. Kamiński did note that the film's saving grace was its actors, praising Michał Żebrowski, Zbigniew Zamachowski, Grażyna Wolszczak, and others.

Piotr Stasiak of gry-online praised the actors, scenography, costumes, and music, but criticized the fragmentary, incoherent plot, which was apparently due to the producers being unable to agree on the main plot and structure, and trying to summarize all of the key plot elements of the planned TV series episodes into one 2-hour movie.

Bartosz Kotarba of esensja criticized the plot, which "tries to tell too much and ends up telling too little", and the special effects, noting that the plastic dragon used for special effects was so lackluster that it resulted in salvos of laughter in the film audience. The reviewer was also critical of the unnecessary nudity and poor dialogue, though praised the actors for their efforts, as well as the music.

Sapkowski himself in several interviews laconically expressed his negative opinion about the film: "I can answer only with a single word, an obscene, albeit a short one". "I am a Polish Catholic, it is Lent now; I cannot utter swear words".

In a 2016 review, Barnaba Siegel of Gazeta.pl referred to the film as "the film we all want to forget". Siegel noted that while some actors were good, others acted as if in a story directed at children. Siegel also criticized some casting decisions, which portrayed then-popular comedy actors in serious roles, making it more difficult for audiences to treat the production as aimed at adults. Siegel was also critical of the plot, special effects, and costuming. He attributed the failures of the production to an inexperienced production crew, in particular director Marek Brodzki.

In a 2018 Gazeta Wyborcza retrospective, Maciej Grzenkowicz noted that the film has been "crushed by the reviewers and laughed out by fans".

Filmweb provides a score of 3.9/10.

The film has been subject to several analyses in academic research. In his 2015 article on The Hexer film and series, Robert Dudziński noted that both became in Poland "widely recognized examples of the weak level of Polish cinema's entertainment releases and a common butt of jokes of Polish science fiction and fantasy fans".

Awards 
Despite its poor critical reception, the film received several award nominations in Poland related to its music score by Grzegorz Ciechowski. Ciechowski's music for The Hexer won the 2002 Polish Film Awards for the Best Film Music in 2001, as well as the Fryderyk award for the Best 2001 Original Soundtrack.

See also

 Wiedźmin (album) – the film's soundtrack
 The Witcher – the fantasy series
 List of characters in The Witcher series

Notes

References

External links
 
 
 
 Unofficial website of the film 
 Original Soundtrack

2001 films
2000s fantasy adventure films
2001 independent films
Films based on Slavic mythology
Polish fantasy adventure films
Polish independent films
2000s Polish-language films
Sword and sorcery films
The Witcher
Films based on multiple works of a series